Lake Dennison Recreation Area is a  Massachusetts state park located in the town of Winchendon.

Activities and amenities
Lake Dennison: The lake offers a swimming beach with restrooms, pavilion, and picnic areas. Fishing and a ramp for non-motorized boating are also available. 
Camping: There are 150 campsites and a dump station.
Trails: Trails are used for hiking, horseback riding, cross-country skiing, and snowmobiling.
The park also offers showers, restricted hunting, and interpretive programs.

References

External links
Lake Dennison Recreation Area Department of Conservation and Recreation
Birch Hill Dam Project Map U.S. Army Corps of Engineers

State parks of Massachusetts
Parks in Worcester County, Massachusetts
Campgrounds in Massachusetts